Normal Life is an American sitcom television series that aired from March 21 until July 18, 1990.

Premise
This series was based on the real unconventional home life of the Zappa children and their rocker dad Frank Zappa.

Cast
Max Gail as Max Harlow
Cindy Williams as Anne Harlow
Moon Unit Zappa as Tess Harlow
Dweezil Zappa as Jake Harlow
Josh Williams as Simon Harlow
Bess Meyer as Prima
Jim Staahl as Dr. Bob

Episodes

References

External links
 
TV Guide

1990 American television series debuts
1990 American television series endings
1990s American sitcoms
English-language television shows
CBS original programming
Television shows set in Los Angeles